The 32nd Air Refueling Squadron, sometimes written as 32d Air Refueling Squadron, is part of the 305th Air Mobility Wing at Joint Base McGuire-Dix-Lakehurst, New Jersey. It operates the KC-10 Extender aircraft conducting air refueling missions. The squadron is one of the oldest in the United States Air Force, its origins dating to 19 May 1917, being organized at Kelly Field, Texas. The squadron deployed to England as part of the American Expeditionary Force during World War I. During World War II, the squadron saw combat service as a B-17 Flying Fortress unit, assigned to the Fifteenth Air Force in Italy. During the early years of the Cold War, it was an RB-47 Stratojet Strategic Reconnaissance Squadron as part of Strategic Air Command (SAC).

History

World War I
The squadron's origins begin on 19 May 1917, about a month after the United States' entry into World War I. On that date a group of recruits were organized at Kelly Field, Texas under the title of the Second Provisional Company, F. That was later changed to First Provisional Company E. At Kelly Field, the new Army recruits received basic military indoctrination by having drill in the mornings, then spending the balance of each day in the construction of facilities at the new camp, building roads, barracks and aircraft hangars in the afternoons.  On 30 June the company was given the permanent designation of the 32d Aero Squadron.

On 11 August, orders were received for the 32d to deploy to France. The 30th to 37th Aero Squadrons were sent as a group to Fort Totten, New York, and embarked on the RMS Baltic on 23 August for their trans-Atlantic voyage. They arrived on 15 September at Liverpool, England, where 50 men of the group were selected to remain to train for aircraft mechanic instruction with the Royal Air Force. The balance of the squadron were ordered to Le Harve, France, arriving on 18 September. There most of the men of the group were sent to various French aviation schools for training to maintain French aircraft. The remainder of the group was designated as the 32d Aero Squadron and sent to the new Issoudun Aerodrome in Central France. There the squadron was engaged in construction activities, building roads, barracks and hangars for what was designated as the 3d Air Instructional Center.

The 32d Aero Squadron remained at Issoudun Aerodrome for the balance of the war, engaging in construction activities at the facility as it grew and expanded. By the end of the war, the complex had grown to fifteen different airfields, all with support buildings and facilities. In November 1918, the 32d was reassigned to the Third Army Air Service, being moved to Trier Airdrome, in the Rhineland of Germany to repair the facility for use by the Air Service. In early January 1919, orders for demobilization were received and the squadron moved to a Base Port at Bordeaux, France for the return voyage back to the United States. It remained at the base camp until March, when it finally sailed for New York, arriving at Mitchel Field about 5 April. There the men of the 32d Aero Squadron were demobilized and returned to civilian life. The squadron was itself demobilized formally on 14 April 1919.

Inter-war years
The squadron was reconstituted in the Army Air Service as the 32d Bombardment Squadron on 24 March 1923. It was assigned to the 7th Bombardment Group. however it was not organized or activated until 24 June 1932 when it was assigned to the 19th Bombardment Group at Rockwell Field, San Diego, California. The 32d was equipped with Keystone B-3 bombers. It was moved in 1935 along with the group to the new March Field, near Riverside, where it received a mix of Martin B-10 and B-12 monoplane bombers.

In the late 1930s, the 32d received B-18 Bolo medium and early model YB-17 Flying Fortress heavy bombers. In 1940, it received the new B-17B Flying Fortress, the first production version of the B-17. The squadron was reassigned to Albuquerque Army Air Base, New Mexico on 4 June 1941. Its purpose was to train air and ground crews for reconnaissance and bombing duty with the B-17 before deployment to Clark Field in the Philippine Islands. On 23 November it moved to Hamilton Field, California to stage for its subsequent movement to Clark Field. It was at Hamilton Field on 7 December 1941 during the Pearl Harbor Attack.

Upon the outbreak of World War II, the 32d moved to Muroc Army Airfield, its mission was antisubmarine patrols along the Southern California coast. On 16 December it was attached to the provisional Sierra Bombardment Group, where it mission was antisubmarine patrol duty. However, as conditions in the Philippines worsened, the Air Echelon B-17s departed via Hawaii on 17 December. Upon arrival at Hickam Field, the aircraft were pressed into service for defensive reconnaissance patrols around the Hawaiian Islands. The Ground Echelon at Muroc was concurrently dissolved and personnel assigned to other units.

World War II

The squadron was reformed in the United States in March 1942, by a redesignation of the newly established 354th Bombardment Squadron. It trained under Second Air Force. It flew antisubmarine patrols off the California coast from late May to early June 1942, then over the Mid-Atlantic coast from June to July 1942.

The squadron deployed to European Theater of Operations (ETO) in August 1942, being assigned to VIII Bomber Command, one of the first B-17 heavy bomb squadrons assigned to England. It engaged in strategic bombardment operations over occupied Europe, attacking enemy military and industrial targets. It was reassigned to Mediterranean Theater of Operations (MTO) as part of Operation Torch invasion of North Africa. It operated from desert airfields in Algeria and Tunisia during North African and Tunisian campaign. It was assigned to Northwest African Strategic Air Force during the invasion of Sicily, and later Italy in 1943. It was allocated to Fifteenth Air Force for strategic bombing of Nazi Germany and occupied Europe. It attacked enemy targets primarily in the Balkans, Southern France, Southern Germany and Austria from southern Italy. It engaged in shuttle bombing missions to airfields in the Soviet Union during the summer of 1944.

Personnel were largely demobilized after German capitulation in May 1945. The squadron was reassigned to the United States and was programmed for conversion to B-29 Superfortress operations and deployment to the Central Pacific Area. These plans were canceled after Japanese capitulation in August 1945. The aircraft were sent to storage and the unit was inactivated largely as a paper unit in October 1945.

Cold War
On 4 August 1946, the 788th Bombardment Squadron was inactivated and its mission, personnel and equipment were transferred to the 32d Bombardment Squadron, which was simultaneously activated. It was deployed to Furstenfeldbruck AB, Germany, July–August 1948; to RAF Station Scrampton, England, October 1948-January 1949; and to RAF Stations Lakenheath and Sculthorpe, May–November 1950 for "show of force" missions in Europe as a result of the Berlin Blockade by the Soviet Union and rising Cold War tensions in Europe.

The squadron was equipped in 1953 with B-47 Stratojets, and trained with electronic countermeasures from 1958–1964.

In 1965 the squadron was redesignated 32d Air Refueling Squadron and assumed the mission, personnel and equipment of the 321st Air Refueling Squadron, which was simultaneously inactivated, at Lockbourne Air Force Base. The unit performed air refueling operations worldwide from 1965–1979 and since 1981. From c. 10 June–8 October 1972, all personnel and aircraft were on loan to units in the Pacific or other Strategic Air Command units, leaving the squadron unmanned. It deployed most aircraft and personnel to Southeast Asia October–December 1972, in support of Operation Linebacker II. It again deployed aircrews and tankers to various locations for air refueling support in Southwest Asia from August 1990–April 1991.

Modern era
The 32d received the first KC-10A delivered to the Air Force, at Barksdale AFB, on 17 March 1981.

Lineage
 Organized as the 32d Aero Squadron on 13 June 1917
 Demobilized on 14 April 1919
 Reconstituted and redesignated 32d Bombardment Squadron on 24 March 1923
 Activated on 24 June 1932
 Redesignated: 32d Bombardment Squadron (Heavy) on 6 December 1939
 Redesignated: 32d Bombardment Squadron, Heavy c. 6 March 1944
 Redesignated: 32d Bombardment Squadron, Very Heavy on 5 August 1945
 Inactivated on 15 October 1945
 Activated on 4 August 1946
 Redesignated 32d Bombardment Squadron, Medium on 28 May 1948
 Discontinued and inactivated, on 8 June 1964
 Redesignated 32d Air Refueling Squadron, Heavy and activated on 23 December 1964 (not organized)
 Organized on 15 March 1965
 Inactivated on 30 September 1979
 Activated on 1 November 1981
 Redesignated 32d Air Refueling Squadron on 1 September 1991

Assignments
 Unknown, 13 June–September 1917 (probably Post Headquarters, Camp Kelly)
 Third Aviation Instruction Center, September 1917 – January 1919
 Unknown, January–14 April 1919
 19th Bombardment Group, 24 June 1932 (attached to IV Bomber Command, 22 October–December 1941, apparently attached to 7th Bombardment Group for operations, c. 8–15 December 1941)
 Sierra Bombardment Group, 16 December 1941
 Fourth Air Force, 17 January 1942
 Second Air Force, 16 March 1942 (attached to 301st Bombardment Group, 16–30 March 1942)
 301st Bombardment Group, 31 March 1942 – 15 October 1945
 301st Bombardment Group, 4 August 1946 (attached to 301st Bombardment Wing after 10 February 1951)
 301st Bombardment Wing, 16 June 1952 – 8 June 1964
 Strategic Air Command, 23 December 1964 (not organized)
 301st Air Refueling Wing, 15 March 1965 – 30 September 1979
 2nd Bombardment Wing, 1 November 1981
 2nd Operations Group, 1 September 1991
 458th Operations Group, 1 June 1992
 305th Operations Group, 1 July 1995 – present

Stations

Camp Kelly, Texas 13 June-11 August 1917
Étampes, France 20 September 1917
 Issoudun Aerodrome, France 28 September 1917
Bordeaux, France c. 6 January-c. 18 March 1919
 Mitchel Field, New York c. 5–14 April 1919
 Rockwell Field, California 24 June 1932
 March Field, California 25 October 1935
 Army Air Base, Albuquerque, New Mexico c. 4 June-22 November 1941
 Air echelon, which was at Hamilton Field, CA, under orders for movement to Philippine Islands at time of Japanese attack on Hawaii on 7 December 1941, apparently moved to Muroc Army Air Field, California, c. 8 December 1941, Ground echelon departed San Francisco aboard ship on 6 December 1941 and returned on 9 December 1941
 Army Air Base, Bakersfield, California 17 December 1941 (Air echelon evidently departed for Southwest Pacific, c. late December 1941; concurrently dissolved and personnel assigned to other units0
 Geiger Field, Washington, 14 March 1942 (ir echelon re-manned and re-equipped from inactivating 354th Bombardment Squadron)
 Alamogordo Army Air Field, New Mexico 27 May 1942 (operated From: Muroc Army Air Field, California (c. 28 May - 14 June 1942)
 Richard E. Byrd Field, Virginia 21 June-19 July 1942

 RAF Chelveston, England 18 August 1942
 Tafaraoui Airfield, Algeria 26 November 1942
 Maison Blanche Airport, Algiers, Algeria, 6 December 1942
 Biskra Airfield, Algeria 16 December 1942
 Ain M'lila Airfield, Algeria 16 January 1943
 Saint-Donat Airfield, Algeria 8 March 1943
 Oudna Airfield, Tunisia 6 August 1943
 Cerignola Airfield, Italy 11 December 1943
 Lucera Airfield, Italy 2 February 1944-July 1945
 Sioux Falls Army Air Field, South Dakota 28 July 1945
 Mountain Home Army Air Field, Idaho 17 August 1945
 Pyote Army Air Field, Texas 23 August-15 October 1945
 Clovis Army Air Field, New Mexico 4 August 1946
 Smoky Hill Army Air Field (later Smoky Hill Air Force Base), Kansas 16 July 1947
 Barksdale Air Force Base, Louisiana 7 November 1949
Deployed: RAF Lakenheath, England (16 May - 1 December 1950)
Deployed: RAF Brize Norton, England (8 December 1952 – 6 March 1953)
Deployed: Sidi Slimane Air Base, French Morocco (14 February - 15 April 1954)
 Lockbourne Air Force Base (later Rickenbacker Air Force Base), Ohio 15 March 1965 – 30 September 1979
 Barksdale Air Force Base, Louisiana 1 November 1981
 McGuire Air Force Base (later Joint Base McGuire-Dix-Lakehurst), New Jersey 1 September 1994 – present

Aircraft

Douglas C-26 Dolphin (1932–1935)
Fokker O-27 (1932–1935)
 Martin B-12 (1932–1935)
Keystone B-3 (1932–1935)
 Martin B-10 (1935–1941)
Douglas B-18 Bolo (1935–1941)
Boeing B-17 Flying Fortress (1935–1941, 1942–1945)

Boeing B-29 Superfortress (1947–1953)
Boeing B-47 Stratojet (1953–1961, 1963–1964)
 Boeing RB-47 Stratojet (1958)
 Boeing EB-47 Stratojet (1961–1964)
Boeing EC-135 (1965–1966)
Boeing KC-135 Stratotanker (1965–1979)
McDonnell Douglas KC-10 Extender (1981–present)

See also

 List of American Aero Squadrons
 Boeing B-17 Flying Fortress Units of the Mediterranean Theater of Operations

References

Notes
 Explanatory notes

 Citations

Bibliography

External links
Joint Base McGuire-Dix-Lakehurst (official website)
 Air Mobility Command (official website)

032
Military units and formations in New Jersey
Military units and formations established in 1965